Ay Tamer is a village in Kerend Rural District, Dashli Borun District, Gonbad-e Qabus County, Golestan Province, Iran. At the 2006 census, its population was 1,004, in 210 families.

References 

Populated places in Gonbad-e Kavus County